Nelson Lee (born October 16, 1975) is a Taiwanese-Canadian actor. He is best known for portraying Shen in Blade: The Series and Dragon King in Stargirl.

Life and career
Lee was born in Taipei, Taiwan on October 16, 1975.

He starred in two episodes Oz (2002), as inmate Li Chen, and in some episodes of Law & Order.

In 2020, Lee was cast as Dragon King in Stargirl''.

Lee is a 1993 graduate from Saint John High School.

Filmography

Film

Television

Video games

References

External links
 Nelson Lee's MySpace
 
 Blade: The Series Official site

1975 births
Taiwanese male film actors
Taiwanese male television actors
Taiwanese male voice actors
Living people
Canadian male film actors
Canadian male television actors
Canadian male voice actors
Canadian expatriate male actors in the United States
Male actors from Taipei